Hashioka is a Japanese surname. Notable people with the surname include:

, Japanese footballer
, Japanese footballer
, Japanese boxer
, Japanese long jumper

See also
Hashioka Station, a railway station in Takamatsu, Kagawa Prefecture, Japan

Japanese-language surnames